In June 2017, France played a three-test series against South Africa as part of the 2017 mid-year rugby union tests. They played the Springboks over the three-week June International window (5 June–25 June), and the matches were part of the fifth year of the global rugby calendar established by the World Rugby, which runs through to 2019. This was France' first visit to South Africa since 2010 and the first test series between the teams since 2005. The last time the sides met was during the 2013 end-of-year international, where South Africa won 19–10 in Paris.

Fixtures

Squads
Note: Ages, caps and clubs are as per 10 June 2017, the first test match of the tour.

France
On 27 May, France named a 35-man squad ahead of their three-test series against South Africa.

On 29 May, Nans Ducuing was called up to the squad as an injury replacement for Djibril Camara.

On 5 June, Paul Jedrasiak and François Trinh-Duc were called up to the squad as injury cover for Arthur Iturria and Camille Lopez.

Coaching team:
 Head coach:  Guy Novès
 Defence coach:  Gerald Bastide
 Backs coach:  Jean-Frederic Dubois
 Forwards coach:  Yannick Bru

South Africa
South Africa named a 31-man squad for South Africa's three-test series against France on 23 May 2017.

Coaching team:
 Head coach:  Allister Coetzee
 Defence coach:  Brendan Venter
 Backs coach:   Franco Smith
 Forwards coach:  Johann van Graan

Matches

First test

Notes:
 Andries Coetzee, Ross Cronjé, Dillyn Leyds, Raymond Rhule and Courtnall Skosan (all South Africa) and Mohamed Boughanmi and Vincent Rattez (both France) made their international debuts.

Second test

Notes:
 Nans Ducuing and Damian Penaud (both France) made their international debuts. Penaud scored a try on his debut.
 Elton Jantjies passed 100 international points.

Third test

Notes:
 Ruan Dreyer (South Africa) made his international debut. 
 South African captain Warren Whiteley was declared as forfeit just before the kick-off.

See also
 2017 mid-year rugby union internationals
 History of rugby union matches between France and South Africa

References

2017 rugby union tours
2017
2017
2016–17 in French rugby union
2017 in South African rugby union